The hawknose grenadier, Coelorinchus oliverianus, is a species of rattail found around New Zealand,  at depths of between 80 and 1300 m.  Its length is between 20 and 35 cm.

References
 
 
 Tony Ayling & Geoffrey Cox, Collins Guide to the Sea Fishes of New Zealand,  (William Collins Publishers Ltd, Auckland, New Zealand 1982) 

Macrouridae
Endemic marine fish of New Zealand
Fish described in 1927